Phillips House may refer to:

in the United States
(by state then city)

 Phillips House (Arcata, California), listed on the National Register of Historic Places (NRHP) in Humboldt County
 Phillips House (Long Beach, California) listed among the City of Long Beach historic landmarks
Phillips Mansion, Pomona, California, NRHP-listed in Los Angeles County
Harry and Lilly Phillips House, Fruita, Colorado, NRHP-listed in Mesa County
Capron-Phillips House, Coventry, Connecticut, NRHP-listed in Tolland County
Phillips Potato House, Laurel, Delaware, NRHP-listed in Sussex County
 Dr. P. Phillips House, Orlando, Florida, NRHP-listed in Orange County
George Phillips House, Columbus, Georgia, NRHP-listed in Muscogee County
William D. Phillips Log Cabin, Hogansville, Georgia, NRHP-listed in Meriwether County
Phillips-Sims House, Hogansville, Georgia, NRHP-listed in Troup County
Phillips-Turner-Kelly House, Monticello, Georgia, NRHP-listed in Jasper County
Alfred Phillips House, Gibson City, Illinois, NRHP-listed
William Phillips House, Hodgenville, Kentucky, NRHP-listed in LaRue County
Phillips' Folly, Maysville, Kentucky, NRHP-listed
Josiah Phillips House, Sonora, Kentucky, NRHP-listed in Hardin County
E. M. Phillips House, Southbridge, Massachusetts, NRHP-listed
 Phillips House, a VIP wing of Massachusetts General Hospital, Boston, Massachusetts
Ernie Phillips House, Grandin, Missouri, NRHP-listed in Carter County
Hotel Phillips, Kansas City, Missouri, NRHP-listed
John Archibald Phillips House, Poplar Bluff, Missouri, NRHP-listed in Butler County
R.O. Phillips House, Lincoln, Nebraska, NRHP-listed in Lancaster County
Crane-Phillips House, Cranford, New Jersey, NRHP-listed
Joseph Phillips Farm, Titusville, New Jersey, NRHP-listed in Mercer County
Harriet Phillips Bungalow, Claverack, New York, NRHP-listed
 Phillips House (Poughkeepsie, New York), NRHP-listed
John Evander Phillips House, Cameron, North Carolina, NRHP-listed in Evander County
King-Phillips-Deibel House, Medina, Ohio, NRHP-listed in Medina County
Frank and Jane Phillips House, Bartlesville, Oklahoma, NRHP-listed in Washington County
Waite Phillips Mansion, Tulsa, Oklahoma, NRHP-listed in Tulsa County
 John Phillips House, Polk County, Oregon, NRHP-listed
Joseph and Esther Phillips Plantation, Atglen, Pennsylvania, NRHP-listed
 Phillips House (Morristown, Tennessee), NRHP-listed in Hamblen County
Judge Alexander H. Phillips House, Victoria, Texas, NRHP-listed in Victoria County
E. F. Phillips House, Waxahachie, Texas, NRHP-listed in Ellis County
Phillips-Ronald House, Blacksburg, Virginia, NRHP-listed in Montgomery County
Phillips Farm, Suffolk, Virginia, NRHP-listed in Suffolk
Dr. John and Viola Phillips House and Office, Newport, Washington, NRHP-listed in Pend Oreille County
 Phillips House (Seattle, Washington), NRHP-listed in Seattle
Duncan Phillips House, Washington, D.C., NRHP-listed
Phillips-Sprague Mine, Beckley, West Virginia, NRHP-listed

See also
Philips House (disambiguation)